The Kenya Union of Clinical Officers (KUCO) is a registered trade union whose membership is open to all Clinical officers who are registered or licensed to practice medicine in Kenya.

KUCO initially applied for registration as the Union of Kenya Clinical Officers in 2009 but the application met firm resistance from the government and rival trade unions leading to a long drawn court case and a judgment against registration. Undeterred, the union pressed on and applied for fresh registration as KUCO. This led to a second court case that ended in protests around the courts and a violent police crackdown that left many of the protesting clinical officers bleeding and nursing serious injuries. The court eventually ruled in favour of the clinical officers and the union was finally registered in 2017.

Healthcare trade unions in Kenya